1:48 scale is a scale commonly used in diecast models, plastic models made from kits, and construction toys. It is especially popular with manufacturers of model aircraft and model trains, where it is known as "O scale". 1:48 is also a popular scale among Lego enthusiasts, since it is approximately the scale of the Lego minifigure.

At this scale,  inch represents 1 foot. It is similar in size to 1:50 scale and 1:43 scale, which are popular for diecast vehicles.

In 2003, Tamiya began to manufacture a line of military ground vehicle models in 1:48 in addition to their more traditional 1:35 scale line. This has been seen as an attempt to break into a new market due to the stiff competition in the larger scale.

Bandai also produces giant robots in this size, called Mega Size.

See also
 Die-cast toy
 Rail transport modelling scales
 Scale model

References

Scale model scales
Construction toys
Scale 1:48